Pain Mahalleh-ye Rudbaneh (also Romanized as Pā’īn Maḩalleh-ye Rūdbaneh; also known as Pā’īn Rūd Beneh) is a village in Rudboneh Rural District, Rudboneh District, Lahijan County, Gilan Province, Iran. At the 2006 census, its population was 415, in 120 families.

References 

Populated places in Lahijan County